Sparta is an unincorporated community in Baker County, Oregon, United States. It was named for Sparta, Illinois, by William H. Packwood, a prominent Oregon pioneer who visited the gold diggings at the Powder River there in 1871.

By 1873, the population was 300 and the town had a general store, a hotel, a meat market, and a brewery; food came from the nearby Eagle Valley.

The town was platted in 1872, and the post office was established in 1872 and ran until 1952. The post office was originally named "Gem" in 1871 and was moved about a mile east when it was renamed Sparta to match the established community. The locale was also known as "Eagle City".

See also
List of ghost towns in Oregon

References

External links
Historic image of Sparta from Salem Public Library

Unincorporated communities in Baker County, Oregon
1872 establishments in Oregon
Populated places established in 1872
Unincorporated communities in Oregon